Columnar Valley is a valley trending northwest between The Handle and Table Mountain in the northwest part of the Royal Society Range, Victoria Land. It was descriptively named by Alan Sherwood, New Zealand Geological Survey field party leader in the area, 1987–88, after the columnar-jointed dolerite that forms the valley walls.

References
 

Valleys of Victoria Land
Scott Coast